Academy Awards best screenplay nominee Hui-Ling Wang's first television screenplay after Crouching Tiger, Hidden Dragon.

Cast
Tan Yuwei, played by Zhao Wei
Houzi, played by Zhou Yiwei
Huo Ran, played by Tuo Zonghua
Yin Zhihan, played by Qin Hailu
Su Lijuan, played by Pan Hong

International broadcast

Soundtrack
Theme Song:At This Time(Chinese Title:这一次) performed by Zhao Wei

References

External links
Xinhuanet.com

2007 Chinese television series debuts
2007 Chinese television series endings
Mandarin-language television shows
Chinese romance television series